The Keeper of the Plains is a  Cor-Ten steel sculpture by Kiowa-Comanche artist Blackbear Bosin. It stands at the confluence of the Arkansas and Little Arkansas rivers in Wichita, Kansas, adjacent to the Mid-America All-Indian Center. Surrounding the base of the statue are multiple displays which describe the local tribes that used to inhabit the area, as well as several fire pits which are sometimes lit to illuminate the statue at night. The fire pits, which are known as the Rings of Fire, are lit manually for public safety and run in 15-minute increments. They are generally lit once a night around 7 pm during the winter and at sunset during the summer.

History
The sculpture, commissioned by the city and private organizations to mark the United States Bicentennial, was erected in 1974. It has since become one of Wichita's most recognized and beloved symbols. A spring/summer 2006 project elevated the sculpture on a 30-foot rock promontory so it could be seen from farther away.

A profile image of this statue comprises the motif adopted by the 22nd Air Refueling Wing, a U.S. Air Force flying unit which is based at nearby McConnell Air Force Base. From 1993 through 2004, an image of the statue, along with the words "Keeper of the Plains," appeared on the tails of Boeing KC-135 air refueling tankers assigned to the 22nd ARW.

In popular culture and the arts
The Keeper of the Plains was mentioned by Christian musician Rich Mullins in his 1991 song "Calling Out Your Name".

On March 11, 2021, a photo of the statue was shown as part of a clue on U.S. landmarks on Jeopardy!.

Gallery

See also
List of the tallest statues in the United States

External links
 Kansas State Historical Society
 Mid-America All-Indian Center
 The City of Wichita
 Keeper of the Plains photos & hours

Outdoor sculptures in Kansas
Buildings and structures in Wichita, Kansas
Steel sculptures in Kansas
Colossal statues in the United States
Tourist attractions in Wichita, Kansas
1974 sculptures
1974 establishments in Kansas
Sculptures of Native Americans